Julian Nott (22 June 1944 – 26 March 2019) was a British balloonist who later lived in Santa Barbara, California.  He was known for his record-setting achievements.  Nott set 79 world ballooning records and 96 British aviation records.  He developed balloons for flights to Solar System destinations, particularly Titan.  He flew a working prototype Titan balloon at minus 175 Celsius, approximately the temperature of Titan's atmosphere.

Life
Julian Richard Nott was born in Bristol, UK on 22 June 1944 and attended Epsom College and St John's College, Oxford.  He earned a master's in Physical Chemistry.  After graduation Nott worked in Bangladesh with the Voluntary Service Overseas (VSO).

In 1972, Nott piloted the first hot air balloon crossing of the Sahara.  In 1973, he traversed the Alps in a helium gas balloon.  

Nott hypothesized that two millennia ago, the Nazca Lines geoglyphs could have been formed with guidance of Nazca leaders in a balloon, possibly the earliest balloon flights in human history.   In 1975 to support this theory, he designed and piloted the Nazca Prehistoric Balloon, using only methods and materials available to the Pre-Inca Peruvians 1,000 years ago.  

Nott believed, “...setting a world record is indisputable proof of the success of a new design.”  In 1979 he designed and built the first hot air balloon with a pressurized gondola.  On a late October morning from Longmont, Colorado he flew this new balloon to world record .  It took Nott, in his balloon named "ICI Innovation," 1 hour 9 minutes and 42 seconds to reach the world record altitude.  The ICI Innovation gondola is permanently displayed at the Steven F. Udvar-Hazy Center of the Smithsonian National Air and Space Museum at Dulles Airport.

Nott pioneered the use of hybrid energy for lift, where solar power is a significant heat source, and using this technology in 1981 he crossed the English Channel.  This hybrid balloon relied only the heat of the sun to warm its lifting air during the crossing.    For this historic flight, Nott used Dominic Michaelis’s solar balloon (aircraft registration number G-BAVU).  On 22 August 1981, lifting off North West of Dover, he silently crossed the channel landing at Tournehem-sur-la-Hem of the Pas-de-Calais in France.  Using the burner once, during the landing, to arrest the descent rate.  The British Balloon Museum preserves the solar balloon G-BAVU envelope.  

On 1 November 1984, Nott became the first person to pilot a “pumpkin” superpressure balloon (SPB). He flew the SPB Wilson Endeavour across Australia from Pearce Air Force Base in Perth to Broken Hill;  He believed this was his greatest achievement and planned to us the SPB to circumnavigate the globe.

Nott worked on the airships that flew over the 1984 Los Angeles and 2004 Athens Olympic Games.  He developed a system for gas balloons in which conventional ballast is replaced with cryogenic helium.

As an adjunct professor at Cal Tech and the University of California, Nott lectured on entrepreneurship for scientist, engineers, and mathematicians.  His senior memberships include: American Institute of Aeronautics and Astronautics, Royal Institute of Navigation, Royal Geographical Society, and an Explorers Club Fellow.

In March 2019, following the successful test flight of an experimental pressurized high-altitude balloon over Warner Springs, California, and after a successful landing, his gondola became loose and fell down a slope with Nott inside.  At the hospital, he died from the serious injuries of this accident.  Nott is buried at the Compton Village Cemetery in Compton, Guildford Borough, Surrey, England.

References

External links
 Nott's Super-pressure balloon
 Julian Nott website
 Intellectual Courage and Scientific Ballooning - Exploring Landscapes Near & Far
 Archive
 http://www.spacedata.net/advisors.htm - Dead link
 Who's Who of Ballooning Archive
 FAI website, search records for Julian Nott

1944 births
2019 deaths
Accidental deaths in California
Aviators killed in aviation accidents or incidents in the United States
British aviation record holders
British balloonists
Balloon flight record holders
People educated at Epsom College
People from Santa Barbara, California
Victims of aviation accidents or incidents in 2019
1979 in aviation